Mirbelia subcordata is a species of flowering plant in the family Fabaceae and is endemic to the south-west of Western Australia. It is an erect, spreading shrub with egg-shaped to lance-shaped leaves and yellow or orange and red flowers.

Description
The petals are yellow or orange and red, the standard petal longer than the sepals, the wings and the keel almost as long as the standard. Flowering occurs from September to December and the fruit is a shaggy-hairy, oblong pod.

Taxonomy
Mirbelia subcordata was first formally described in 1853 by Nikolai Turczaninow in the Bulletin de la Société Impériale des Naturalistes de Moscou. The specific epithet (subcordata) means "somewhat heart-shaped", referring to the leaves.

Distribution and habitat
This mirbelia grows on a range of soils on slopes, rises and flats in the Avon Wheatbelt, Esperance Plains and Jarrah Forest bioregions of Western Australia.

Conservation status
Mirbelia subcordata is listed as "not threatened" by the Government of Western Australia Department of Biodiversity, Conservation and Attractions.

References

Mirbelioids
subcordata
Fabales of Australia
Flora of Western Australia
Plants described in 1853
Taxa named by Nikolai Turczaninow